The women's 4 × 100 metre freestyle relay - 34 points swimming events for the 2016 Summer Paralympics took place at the Rio Olympic Stadium on 9 September 2016.

Competition format
Relay teams are based on a point score. The sport class of an individual swimmer is worth the actual number value i.e. sport class S6 is worth six points, sport class S12 is worth twelve points, and so on. The total of all the  competitors must add up to 34 points or less.

Records
Prior to the competition, the World record was as follows:

Final
20:43 9 September 2016:

External links

Notes

Swimming at the 2016 Summer Paralympics